Carriacou and Petite Martinique, also known as the Southern Grenadines, is a dependency of Grenada, lying north of Grenada island and south of Saint Vincent and the Grenadines in the Lesser Antilles. The islands of Carriacou and Petite Martinique belong to the sovereign state of Grenada. Together they all form the 3-island country of Grenada, Carriacou, and Petite Martinique.

Carriacou Island is the largest island of the Grenadines, an archipelago in the Windward Islands chain. The main settlements on the island are Hillsborough, L'Esterre, Harvey Vale, and Windward.

With its  and population of 900, it is smaller than Carriacou. The residents of this island live by boat-building, fishing and seafaring. Carriacou and Petite Martinique are known for its Regatta and Village Maroon.

Colonial history
On 27 September 1650, Jacques du Parquet bought Grenada from the Compagnie des Iles de l'Amerique, which was dissolved, for the equivalent of £1160. In 1657, Jacques du Parquet sold Grenada to Jean de Faudoas, Comte de Sérillac, for the equivalent of £1890. In 1664, King Louis XIV bought out the independent island owners and established the French West India Company. In 1674, the French West India Company was dissolved. Proprietary rule ended in Grenada, which became a French crown colony as a dependency of Martinique.

Carriacou and Petite Martinique was part of the French colony in 1762. It was part of the British Grenada colony from 1763 to 1779 and 1783–1974. It was part of the French Grenada colony from 1779 to 1783. During this turbulent period, most of the land on Carriacou and all of the property on Petite Martinique was owned by a free black woman, Judith Philip, and her family members. It has been a dependency of Grenada since 1974.

Geography
Carriacou is the largest of the Grenadines and is characterized by hilly terrain sloping to white sand beaches.

The island has several natural harbors and many coral reefs and small offshore islets.

Carriacou has no rivers. Residents rely on rainfall for their water.

Islands

Climate
There are two seasons, wet and dry. The dry season is between January and June when the trade winds dominate the climate; the rainy season is from July to December. The climate is tropical.

Politics
Carriacou and Petite Martinique is a Grenadian Constituency. Tevin Andrews, NDC, is the representative for Carriacou and Petite Martinique Constituency and also the Minister of Carriacou and Petite Martinique Affairs. The Grenadian constitution of 1974 guarantees a right to autonomy and local government for Carriacou and Petite Martinique, but this has never been implemented. In 2022, the government of Dickon Mitchell introduced a bill to parliament to establish a local Council for Carriacou and Petite Martinique.

Festivals

There are four major cultural festivals held on Carriacou and one on Petite Martinique. Carnival is held in February or early March. The Carriacou Regatta, held on the first weekend in August, is a racing event for locally built boats. In 2015, the Regatta celebrated its 50th anniversary. The Parang, on the weekend prior to Christmas, celebrates the island's traditional Christmas music and culture. Village Maroons take place year round, and since the turn of the millennium, a new festival of growing popularity has been started – the Carriacou Maroon & String Band Music Festival, held in the last weekend of April of the year. On the weekend of Whitsuntide, Petite Martinique holds their annual Whitsuntide Regatta.

Transport
Carriacou and Petite Martinique's main transport system includes roads and ferries. The people of Carriacou travel mainly by privately run 15 seater buses. Rental cars and taxis are also available and boats are commonplace. Lauriston Airport, located in Lauriston, Carriacou, is the island's major airport, and a small ferry boat known as the Osprey runs between Carriacou, Grenada, and Petite Martinique. The short distances between the Grenadines also enables travel between them by small boats.

Radio stations
KYAK106.com Carriacou's Home Grown Radio Station.
The Harbour Light of the Windwards is a local Christian radio station.
Sister Isles – 92.9 FM

See also
Rough Science, a BBC documentary television series made in Carriacou
List of Caribbean islands

References

External links
Carriacou Regatta Festival 
Live view of Petit Martinique from Belair
Carriacou 2011: a preliminary presentation of some interesting finds

 
1650 establishments in the French colonial empire
Islands of Grenada